Athletics at the 1975 Mediterranean Games were held in Algiers, Algeria.

Medal summary

Men

Women

Medal table

References

Complete 1975 Mediterranean Games Standings.
Mediterranean Games – Past Medallists. GBR Athletics.

Med
Athletics
1975
1975 Mediterranean Games